Hideaki (ひであき) is a masculine Japanese given name.

Possible writings 
Hideaki can be written using different kanji characters and can mean:

秀秋, "excellent", "autumn"
英秋, "outstanding", "autumn"
秀明, "excellent", "bright"
英明, "outstanding", "bright"
秀朗, "excellent", "clear"
秀昭, "excellent", "shining"
英昭, "outstanding", "shining"
秀章, "excellent", "composition"
秀聡, "excellent", "wise"
秀彰, "excellent", "clear"

A popular kanji is 明 (the combination of two different characters 日 = sun and 月 = moon) which means "the light coming from the sun", "sunlight and moonlight", "bright", "intelligent", "wisdom" or "truth". The name can also be written in hiragana.

People with the name 
, Japanese rower
Hideaki Akaiwa (born 1968), Japanese hero of the 2011 Tōhoku earthquake and tsunami
, Japanese animator and film director
, Japanese footballer
, Japanese daimyō
, Japanese swordsman
, Japanese footballer
, Japanese powerlifter
, Japanese record producer and DJ Krush
, Japanese video game director and designer
, Japanese actor
, Japanese actor
, Japanese footballer
, Japanese fencer
, Japanese diplomat
, Japanese hurdler
, Japanese  guitarist
, Japanese footballer
, Japanese composer
, Japanese diplomat
, Japanese ice hockey player
, Japanese rower
, Japanese footballer
Hideaki Miyamura (born 1955), Japanese-born American potter
, Japanese footballer
, Japanese badminton player
, Japanese actor
, Japanese politician
, Japanese baseball player
, Japanese politician
, Japanese footballer
, Japanese pharmacologist and writer
, Japanese manga artist
, Japanese singer and composer
, Japanese footballer
, Japanese actor and singer
, Japanese actor and voice actor
, Japanese singer-songwriter and actor
, Japanese footballer
, Japanese sport wrestler
, Japanese footballer
, Japanese video game composer
, Japanese baseball player
, Japanese cross-country skier
, Japanese kickboxer
, Japanese sport wrestler

Fictional characters
, a character in the manga series Miracle Girls
, a character in the anime series Digimon Fusion
, a character in the manga series Gakuen Heaven
, a character in the manga series Ace of Diamond
, a character in the manga series Ace of Diamond

Japanese masculine given names